Neomphalida is an order of deep-sea snails or limpets,  marine gastropod mollusks. subclass Neomphaliones . 

It contains only one superfamily: Neomphaloidea McLean, 1981

References

 Bouchet P., Rocroi J.P., Hausdorf B., Kaim A., Kano Y., Nützel A., Parkhaev P., Schrödl M. & Strong E.E. (2017). Revised classification, nomenclator and typification of gastropod and monoplacophoran families. Malacologia. 61(1-2): 1-526.

Neomphaliones